Paraburkholderia rhizoxinica is a gram-negative, oxidase and catalase-positive, motile bacterium from the genus Paraburkholderia and the family Burkholderiaceae which was isolated from the plant pathogenic fungus, Rhizopus microsporus. The complete genome of Paraburkholderia rhizoxinica is sequenced.

References

rhizoxinica
Bacteria described in 2007